Cyclodium meniscioides is a fern in the family Dryopteridaceae.

The fern is native to northern and western South America, including in Bolivia, Brazil, Ecuador, Paraguay, central Peru; and on the Guiana Shield in French Guiana, Guyana, Suriname, and Venezuela.

Varieties
Varieties include:
Cyclodium meniscioides var. meniscioides
Cyclodium meniscioides var. paludosum (C.V. Morton) A.R. Sm.
Cyclodium meniscioides var. rigidissimum (C. Chr.) A.R. Sm.

References

Dryopteridaceae
Flora of northern South America
Flora of western South America
Ferns of Brazil
Ferns of the Americas
Plants described in 1836
Taxa named by Carl Borivoj Presl